Millen-Chase-McCalla House, also known as the Topolgus Building, is a historic home located at Bloomington, Monroe County, Indiana.  The original section was built in 1844, and now forms the two-story brick rear wing.  The two-story, brick main section was added in 1854, to form a two-thirds I-house.  The house was remodeled in 1871 in a combination of Greek Revival and Italianate style architecture. It rests on a limestone foundation and has a side-gable roof.  The interior has undergone renovation for commercial uses a number of times; in 2011 it was rehabilitated for use as a restaurant.

It was listed on the National Register of Historic Places in 2014.

References

Houses on the National Register of Historic Places in Indiana
Greek Revival houses in Indiana
Italianate architecture in Indiana
Houses completed in 1871
Buildings and structures in Monroe County, Indiana
National Register of Historic Places in Monroe County, Indiana